Kamarang Airport  is an airport serving the town of Kamarang, in the Cuyuni-Mazaruni Region of Guyana.

The runway has been paved, the paved runway (asphalt) is 1220 metres long (4000') by 18 metres wide (60').

See also

 List of airports in Guyana
 Transport in Guyana

References

External links

Kamarang Airport
OpenStreetMap - Kamarang
OurAirports - Kamarang
SkyVector Aeronautical Charts

Airports in Guyana